Ducktown is an unincorporated community in Forsyth County, in the U.S. state of Georgia.

History
The name may be a transfer from Ducktown, Tennessee. A post office called Ducktown was established in 1899, and remained in operation until 1903. The Georgia General Assembly incorporated the place in 1912 as the "Town of Ducktown". The town's municipal charter was dissolved in 1995.

References

Former municipalities in Georgia (U.S. state)
Unincorporated communities in Forsyth County, Georgia
Populated places disestablished in 1995